Everybody Hates You is the second full-length studio album by the American aggrotech band Combichrist. It was released on March 8, 2005, through the Out of Line record label. The album peaked at #2 on the German Alternative Charts (DAC) and ranked #18 on the DAC Top Albums of 2005.

Track listing

CD1

CD2: Dark Side (Digipack edition)

References

Combichrist albums
2005 albums